The Battle of Kalamata took place on September 9, 1944, between ELAS (the army branch of EAM) against the collaborationist security battalions and the Hellenic gendarmerie. It resulted in ELAS' victory and the liberation of Kalamata. After the battle, members of the Nazi collaborators were killed by the crowd.

The battle 
At dawn of September 9, 1944, after failed negotiations of Middle East Command for the surrender of the security battalions (the proposal was rejected by the collaborationist prefect Dimitrios Perrotis) the battle broke out. The soldiers of the battalions had taken positions in various places throughout the city, from coffee shops to barracks. The forces of ELAS firstly attacked a prison building forcing the gendarmerie that guarded it to surrender and liberating imprisoned members of ELAS that consequently took arms and joined the fight. Giannis Servos, one of the leaders of the 9th regiment of ELAS, was killed in action by the Nazi collaborators that had taken positions in the castle of Kalamata.

Gradually the positions of the security battalions fell to ELAS forces. The hotel Rex and the coffee shop Pantheon were the last positions to be eliminated, at the evening of the same day. The remaining collaborationist forces fled to Meligalas and 87 security battalionists were arrested.

Aftermath 
Along with the 9th regiment of ELAS, relatives of victims of the security battalions also came to the area. Residents of the city added to them after the battle to take revenge against the collaborators. The crowd proceeded to acts of violence killing two of them. After the Battle of Meligalas some days later, 18 or 19 members of the battalions were hanged in the central square of Kalamata, including leading figures of the local Nazi collaborators Dimitrios Perrotis and Ioannis Fragkoudakis.

References 

Battles and operations involving the Greek Resistance
Battles and operations involving the Greek People's Liberation Army
1944 in Greece
Conflicts in 1944
September 1944 events
History of Messenia
Peloponnese in World War II